Kyriakos Pierrakakis (born 1983) is a Greek computer and political scientist, politician and Minister of State and Digital Governance in the Cabinet of Kyriakos Mitsotakis.

Early life and education
He was born in Athens and grew up in the Kato Patisia neighborhood. He is married with three kids.

In 2001 he graduated from Lycée Léonin. From 2001 to 2005 he attended Athens University of Economics and Business and earned a bachelor’s degree in computer science. From 2005 to 2007 he attended John F. Kennedy School of Government, Harvard University earning a Master in Public Policy. From 2007 to 2009 he attended MIT earning a Master of Science in Technology and Policy.

Political career
In 2009 Pierrakakis returned to Greece heading Youth Foundation as president and working on issues dealing with youth entrepreneurship. He also served as an advisor to Anna Diamantopoulou at the Ministry of Economy and Development.

Since 2015 Pierrakakis served as Director of Research at Dianeosis, an independent non-profit think tank. Pierrakakis produced an array of research papers with a strong focus on economic growth and understanding the prevailing perceptions and beliefs among Greeks.

Pierrakakis began his political career in center-left politics. He was elected member of the PaSoK Political Committee in its 9th Congress in 2012 and in 2014 he was a candidate for the European Parliament. Pierrakakis was placed sixth on the Elia ballot with a total of 42.814 votes

During the New Democracy – PaSoK coalition government he was member of the Greek negotiation delegation with the “Troika” appointed by Minister Evangelos Venizelos.

On July 9, 2019, he was appointed Minister of State and Digital Governance by Kyriakos Mitsotakis.

Publications
• "The sustainable growth paradigm: implications for technology and policy" (2009)
• "Work Values in Politics: The European Union Debt Crisis as a Case Study" (2019, co-authored with Anna Diamantopoulou)

References 

Harvard Kennedy School alumni
Massachusetts Institute of Technology alumni
Government ministers of Greece
21st-century Greek politicians